The 1999 Star World Championships were held in Punta Ala, Italy between September 1 and 12, 1999.

Results

References

Star World Championships
1999 in sailing
Sailing competitions in Italy